Russellville is a village in Lawrence County, Illinois, United States. The population was 94 at the 2010 census.

History
Russellville is rooted in a fort built by Samuel and Jonathan Allison near the site of an abandoned Indian village known as "Little Village" in the early 1800s.  A town site was platted in 1835, and named for the Russell brothers, August, Andrew, and Clement, who provided lumber for the settlement's first buildings.  Russellville incorporated in 1875.

Geography
Russellville is located in northeastern Lawrence County on the west bank of the Wabash River, which forms the Illinois–Indiana border. Illinois Route 33 passes through the village center, leading north  to Palestine and south  to Westport, across the river from Vincennes, Indiana.

Demographics

As of the census of 2000, there were 119 people, 52 households, and 27 families residing in the village. The racial makeup of the village was 94.96% White, 0.84% from other races, and 4.20% from two or more races. Hispanic or Latino of any race were 10.08% of the population.

There were 52 households, out of which 23.1% had children under the age of 18 living with them, 44.2% were married couples living together, 7.7% had a female householder with no husband present, and 46.2% were non-families. 44.2% of all households were made up of individuals, and 13.5% had someone living alone who was 65 years of age or older. The average household size was 2.29 and the average family size was 3.21.

In the village, the population was spread out, with 29.4% under the age of 18, 7.6% from 18 to 24, 25.2% from 25 to 44, 22.7% from 45 to 64, and 15.1% who were 65 years of age or older. The median age was 39 years. For every 100 females, there were 105.2 males. For every 100 females age 18 and over, there were 104.9 males.

The median income for a household in the village was $23,750, and the median income for a family was $31,667. Males had a median income of $30,417 versus $16,250 for females. The per capita income for the village was $11,843. There were 19.2% of families and 42.5% of the population living below the poverty line, including 53.1% of under eighteens and 55.0% of those over 64.

References

Villages in Lawrence County, Illinois
Villages in Illinois